The Publishing Triangle, founded in 1988 by Robin Hardy, is an American association of gay men and lesbians in the publishing industry. They sponsor an annual National Lesbian and Gay Book Month, and have sponsored the annual Triangle Awards program of literary awards for LGBT literature since 1989.

Awards
Audre Lorde Award (lesbian poetry)
Betty Berzon Award for Emerging Writers (early career achievement)
Bill Whitehead Award (lifetime achievement)
Edmund White Award (debut fiction)
Ferro-Grumley Award (fiction)
Judy Grahn Award (lesbian nonfiction)
Leadership Award  
Publishing Triangle Award for Trans and Gender-Variant Literature (transgender)  
Randy Shilts Award (gay nonfiction)  
Robert Chesley Award (drama)  
Thom Gunn Award (gay poetry)

References

External links
 

Publishing organizations
Professional associations based in the United States
1988 establishments in the United States
LGBT professional associations